Enayatollah Atashi (born July 23, 1946, in jahrom) is an Iranian basketball coach. He works for IRIB Varzesh and IRIB TV3, Iranian TV channels as basketball commentator. He is father of Mehrad Atashi Iranian professional basketball player.

Pro career 
Head coach
Head coach of Iran national team (1983), (1998)

Books 
Basketball over time, a book that explains how basketball changes with time.

References

Iranian men's basketball players
1946 births
Living people
Iranian radio and television presenters
People from Jahrom
Sportspeople from Fars province